The Vice-Admiral of Hampshire  was responsible for the defence of the county of Hampshire, England.

History
As a vice-admiral, the post holder was the chief of naval administration for his district. His responsibilities included pressing men for naval service, deciding the lawfulness of prizes (captured by privateers), dealing with salvage claims for wrecks and acting as a judge.

The earliest record of an appointment was of Sir Adrian Poynings 1558–1571.

In 1863 the Registrar of the Admiralty Court stated that the offices had 'for many years been purely honorary' (HCA 50/24 pp. 235–6). Appointments were made by the Lord High Admiral when this officer existed. When the admiralty was in commission appointments were made by the crown by letters patent under the seal of the admiralty court.

Vice-admirals of Hampshire
This is a list of people who have served as Vice-Admiral of Hampshire. A separate Vice-Admiral of the Isle of Wight was appointed from 1569 to 1571, and from 1734 to 1807, although during the latter period, the Vice-Admiral of Hampshire intermittently held both posts.

Sir Adrian Poynings 1558–1571
Sir Edward Horsey 1571–1583
William Plasted 1583–1584 jointly with
Edmund Yonge 1583 and
Thomas Plasted 1583–1584
George Carey, 2nd Baron Hunsdon 1584–1603
Henry Wriothesley, 3rd Earl of Southampton 1603–1624
Edward Conway, 1st Viscount Conway 1624–1631
Richard Weston, 1st Earl of Portland 1631–1635
Jerome Weston, 2nd Earl of Portland 1635–1642
vacant
Philip Herbert, 4th Earl of Pembroke 1644–1647 (Parliamentary)
Robert Hammond 1647–1649 (Parliamentary)
Charles Fleetwood 1650–1652 jointly with (Parliamentary)
William Sydenham 1650–1660 (Parliamentary)
Sir Anthony Ashley Cooper, 2nd Baronet 1660
Jerome Weston, 2nd Earl of Portland 1660–1662
Thomas Colepeper, 2nd Baron Colepeper 1662–1669
Sir Robert Holmes 1669–1692
Charles Paulet, 2nd Duke of Bolton 1692–1710
John Richmond Webb 1710–1714
Charles Paulet, 2nd Duke of Bolton 1714–1722
Charles Powlett, 3rd Duke of Bolton 1722–1733
John Wallop, 1st Viscount Lymington 1733–1742
Charles Powlett, 3rd Duke of Bolton 1742–1754
Harry Powlett, 4th Duke of Bolton 1755–1759
Charles Powlett, 5th Duke of Bolton 1759–1765
vacant
Harry Powlett, 6th Duke of Bolton 1767–1794
vacant
George Paulet, 12th Marquess of Winchester 1797–1800
vacant
Thomas Orde-Powlett, 1st Baron Bolton 1803–1807
James Harris, 2nd Earl of Malmesbury 1807–1831
Charles Anderson-Pelham, 1st Earl of Yarborough 1831–1846

Vice-admirals of the Isle of Wight
Edward Horsey 1567–1571
held by Hampshire
John Wallop, 1st Viscount Lymington 1734–1742
Charles Powlett, 3rd Duke of Bolton 1742–1746 (also Vice-Admiral of Hampshire)
John Wallop, 1st Earl of Portsmouth 1746–1762
Thomas Holmes, 1st Baron Holmes 1763–1764
Hans Stanley 1765–1767
Harry Powlett, 6th Duke of Bolton 1767–1771 (also Vice-Admiral of Hampshire)
Hans Stanley 1771–1780
Sir Richard Worsley, 7th Baronet 1780–1791
Thomas Orde-Powlett, 1st Baron Bolton 1791–1807 (also Vice-Admiral of Hampshire from 1803)
held by Hampshire

References

External links
Institute of Historical Research

Military ranks of the United Kingdom
Vice-Admirals
Vice-Admirals
Hampshire